Roger Darin "R. J." Prince Jr. (born April 19, 1995) is an American football offensive guard who is a free agent. He played college at North Carolina before going undrafted to the Pittsburgh Steelers in 2018.

Professional career

Pittsburgh Steelers
Prince was signed by the Pittsburgh Steelers after going undrafted in the 2018 NFL Draft. He was waived on September 1, 2018, and was signed to the practice squad the next day. He signed a reserve/future contract on December 31, 2018. He was waived on May 13, 2019.

Baltimore Ravens
On May 16, 2019, Prince was signed by the Baltimore Ravens. He was waived on August 31, 2019, and was signed to the practice squad the next day. He signed a reserve/future contract with the Ravens on January 13, 2020. He was waived on July 27, 2020. He was re-signed to their practice squad on November 10, 2020. He was elevated to the active roster on December 2 and January 9, 2021, for the team's week 12 and wild card playoff games against the Pittsburgh Steelers and Tennessee Titans, and reverted to the practice squad after each game. His practice squad contract with the team expired after the season on January 25, 2021.

New England Patriots
On June 17, 2021, Prince signed a two-year deal contract, worth $1 million with the New England Patriots. He was waived on August 24, 2021.

References

External links
North Carolina Tar Heels bio

1995 births
Living people
American football offensive guards
Baltimore Ravens players
New England Patriots players
North Carolina Tar Heels football players
People from Albemarle, North Carolina
Pittsburgh Steelers players
Players of American football from North Carolina